Pickaway Township may refer to the following townships in the United States:

 Pickaway Township, Pickaway County, Ohio
 Pickaway Township, Shelby County, Illinois